Parliamentary elections were held in Estonia between 5 and 7 May 1923. There were some controversies - some lists, most remarkably Communist, were declared void before the elections because of electoral law violations, and the results gave Estonia its most fragmented parliament ever.

Results

See also
II Riigikogu

References

External links
II Riigikogu valimised: 5.-7. mail 1923 Riigi Statistika Keskbüroo

Parliamentary elections in Estonia
Estonia
1923 in Estonia